Dzulkifli bin Abdul Razak (born 1951) is a Malaysian emeritus professor, educationist and scientist who has served as the 6th Rector of the International Islamic University Malaysia (IIUM) since 1 August 2018. He was the Chairman of Universiti Sains Islam Malaysia (USIM) Board of Directors from April 2016 to September 2018.

Education 
Dzulkifli obtained a degree of Bachelor of Pharmacy from Universiti Sains Malaysia (USM) and a degree of Master of Science in Pharmacology from University of Strathclyde.

He undertook secondary education at the Malay College Kuala Kangsar (MCKK). He is a Fellow of the Academy of Sciences Malaysia, the World Academy of Art and Science, and the Malaysian Institute of Management. He is also Honorary Lifetime Member of Asian Academy of Management.

Career 
Dzulkifli started his career as an academician at USM, where he became its Vice Chancellor from 2000 to 2011. He then left USM to become the Vice Chancellor of Albukhary International University before moving to USIM to become a Distinguished Fellow at its Faculty of Leadership and Management and Chair of Islamic Leadership in 2014.

Prior to joining USIM, he served as a member of the World Health Organization (WHO) Expert Advisory Panel on Drug Policy and Management from 1995 to 2010 and the WHO Scientific Committee of Tobacco Product Regulation from 2004 to 2006. He was also President of the International Association of Universities from 2012 to 2016.

On 1 April 2016, Dzulkifli was appointed as Chairman of USIM Board of Directors for a three-year term.

On 1 August 2018, Dzulkifli, who was a Visiting Professor of IIUM between 2011 and 2013, succeeded Professor Dato' Sri Dr. Zaleha Kamaruddin as Rector of IIUM. He is expected to hold the office for a three-year term.

Honours 
Universitas 21 awarded Gilbert Medal to Dzulkifli on 4 May 2017 in recognition of his contributions to education. He was also awarded with honorary doctorates for the same. He was made an Honorary Doctor of Science by the University of Portsmouth, University of Nottingham and Mykolas Romeris University, and an Honorary Doctor of Educational Science by Istanbul Commerce University.

Honour of Malaysia
  :
  Commander of the Order of Loyalty to the Crown of Malaysia (PSM) – Tan Sri (2008)
  :
  Knight Commander of the Order of the Crown of Selangor (DPMS) – Dato' (2001)
  :
  Companion of the Order of the Defender of State (DMPN) – Dato' (2003)
  :
  Knight Commander of the Order of the Crown of Perlis (DPMP) – Dato' (2004)

Family 
Dzulkifi is the second child of Abdul Razak Abdul Hamid, the sole Malaysian survivor of Hiroshima bombing that took place in 1945.

He is married to Masrah Abidin and has four children.

References 

Living people
Malaysian pharmacologists
Academic staff of Universiti Sains Islam Malaysia
Knights Commander of the Order of the Crown of Selangor
Commanders of the Order of Loyalty to the Crown of Malaysia
1951 births